Walter Wood Hess Jr. (March 17, 1892 – April 10, 1972) was a United States Army officer with the rank of Brigadier General. He is most famous for his leadership as the Artillery Commander of the 36th Infantry Division.

Early life

Walter Wood Hess Jr. was born in March 1892 in Pennsylvania. He attended the United States Military Academy (USMA)at West Point, New York, in 1911, and graduated 95th as part of the class the stars fell on in June 1915. There were ultimately 59 generals in that graduating class, including: Dwight D. Eisenhower, Omar Bradley, James Van Fleet, Henry Aurand, Joseph T. McNarney, A. Arnim White, Vernon Prichard, Joseph May Swing, Leland Hobbs, Roscoe B. Woodruff, Paul J. Mueller, Charles W. Ryder and Stafford LeRoy Irwin.

He served in France during World War I as an artillery officer (having been commissioned in the Coast Artillery Corps) commanding a battalion. He participated in the Meuse-Argonne Offensive and Ypres - Lys Offensives.

World War II
He was appointed an Artillery officer of the 36th Infantry Division in November 1943. He succeeded Brigadier General Miles A. Cowles in this capacity. Hess participated with the 36th Division in landing at Salerno, Battle of Monte Cassino, Battle of Anzio, Operation Dragoon and Colmar Pocket.

For his leadership of the 36th Infantry Division Artillery, Hess was awarded with Legion of Merit and other awards.

Postwar career
After inactivation of the 36th Infantry Division in December 1945, Hess was transferred to Fort Bragg in North Carolina, where he was appointed as Assistant Commanding General of the Field Artillery Replacement Training Center. Following year, Hess was appointed as Commanding General of that center and succeeded Major general Donald C. Cubbison.

Hess stayed in this capacity just for a short time, because he was transferred back to Europe in 1946 and appointed a Chief of U.S. Military Liaison Mission to Soviet Zone in Germany.

He served there until year 1949, when he was ordered back to the United States and appointed as Executive Officer of the Minnesota Military District. His last command was as Commandant of Fort Carson in Colorado from 1950 to 1952, when he retired.

Brigadier general Walter W. Hess Jr. died on April 10, 1972, and is buried at Arlington National Cemetery together with his wife Ada E. Hess.

Decorations

References

1892 births
1972 deaths
United States Army Coast Artillery Corps personnel
Military personnel from Pennsylvania
United States Military Academy alumni
Burials at Arlington National Cemetery
United States Army personnel of World War I
Recipients of the Legion of Merit
Graduates of the United States Military Academy Class of 1915
United States Army generals of World War II
United States Army generals